Patersonia macrantha is a species of plant in the iris family Iridaceae and is endemic to the northern part of the Northern Territory. It is a tuft-forming herb with linear to sword-shaped leaves and pale violet tepals.

Description
Flowering occurs from January to March.

Taxonomy and naming
Patersonia macrantha was first described in 1846 by George Bentham in Flora Australiensis. Bentham recorded that the type specimens were collected in the Darling Range by Alexander Collie. However, the sheet bearing the type specimens in the Kew Herbarium was inscribed "Armstrong, Port Essington" in W.J. Hooker's handwriting, later crossed out by Bentham with a note "probably Darling Range, Collie (the loose scape was with the Darling Range occidentalis)". The specific epithet (macrantha) means "large-flowered".

Distribution and habitat
This patersonia is widespread in the northern part of the Northern Territory where it grows in forest and woodland.

Conservation status
Patersonia macrantha is classified as "least concern" under the Northern Territory Government Northern Territory Government Territory Parks and Wildlife Conservation Act 1976.

References

macrantha
Flora of Western Australia
Plants described in 1873
Taxa named by George Bentham